Devind Pathmanathan (born 17 February 1995) is a Sri Lankan cricketer. He made his Twenty20 debut for Kalutara Town Club in the 2017–18 SLC Twenty20 Tournament on 24 February 2018. His uncle, Gajan Pathmanathan, was a first-class cricketer.

References

External links
 

1995 births
Kalutara Town Club cricketers
Living people
Place of birth missing (living people)
Sri Lankan cricketers